Bourassa (formerly known as Montreal—Bourassa) is a federal electoral district in Quebec, Canada, that has been represented in the House of Commons of Canada since 1968. Its population in 2021 was 105,637.

Geography
The district includes Montreal North and the eastern part of the neighbourhood of Sault-au-Récollet in the Borough of Ahuntsic-Cartierville.

The neighbouring ridings are Ahuntsic, Saint-Léonard—Saint-Michel, Honoré-Mercier, and Alfred-Pellan.

Demographics
20.4% of the riding's population are of Haitian ethnic origin, the highest such percentage in Canada.

According to the Canada 2021 Census

Ethnic groups: 45.1% White, 29.4% Black, 11.8% Arab, 7.4% Latin American, 2% Southeast Asian, 1.2% South Asian
Languages: 48.2% French, 7.5% Arabic, 7.5% Haitian Creole, 7.2% Spanish, 5.7% Italian, 4.6% English, 2.8% Creole, 1.8% Kabyle, 1.1% Turkish, 1% Vietnamese 
Religions: 60.6% Christian (39.8% Catholic, 2.3% Baptist, 1.8% Pentecostal), 19.3% No Religion, 18% Muslim, 1.1% Buddhist
Median income: $33,200 (2020)
Average income: $38,960 (2020)

History
The electoral district of Bourassa was created in 1966 from Mercier and Laval ridings. The name comes from a street running through the three neighbourhoods which is named after Henri Bourassa.

The name of the riding was changed to "Montreal—Bourassa" in 1971.

In 1976, Montreal—Bourassa was abolished when it was redistributed into a new "Bourassa" riding and Saint-Michel riding. The new Bourassa riding was created from parts of Montreal—Bourassa, Ahuntsic and Anjou—Rivière-des-Prairies ridings.

This riding lost territory to Honoré-Mercier and gained territory from Ahuntsic during the 2012 electoral redistribution.

Members of parliament

This riding has elected the following members of parliament:

Election results

Bourassa, 1979–present

On 16 May 2013, Liberal MP Denis Coderre announced he would resign his seat on 2 June in order to run for Mayor of Montreal. The Chief Electoral Officer received official notification of the vacancy on 3 June 2013 and the by-election had to be called by 30 November 2013.

	

Note: Change based on redistributed results. Conservative vote is compared to the total of the Canadian Alliance vote and Progressive Conservative vote in 2000 election.

Montreal—Bourassa, 1972–1979

		

Note: Social Credit vote is compared to Ralliement créditiste vote in the 1968 election.

Bourassa, 1968–1972

See also
 List of Canadian federal electoral districts
 Past Canadian electoral districts

References

Campaign expense data from Elections Canada
2011 Results from Elections Canada

Riding history from the Library of Parliament
Bourassa (1966–1971)
Montreal—Bourassa (1971–1976)
Bourassa (1976– )

Notes

Federal electoral districts of Montreal
Montréal-Nord
Rivière-des-Prairies–Pointe-aux-Trembles
Ahuntsic-Cartierville